Tashkumyrodon is an extinct mammaliaform from the Middle Jurassic (Callovian) Balabansai Formation of Kyrgyzstan It is named after the town of Tash-Kömür, near where the original specimen was found. It belongs to the order Docodonta and is closely related to Sibirotherium and Tegotherium. There is only one species currently known, Tashkumyrodon desideratus.

The holotype fossil is a lower left molar. Like many Mesozoic mammaliaforms, it is only known from isolated teeth. The fossil is housed at the Zoological Institute of the Russian Academy of Sciences in St. Petersburg.

References

Docodonts
Callovian life
Jurassic animals of Asia
Jurassic synapsids
Fossils of Kyrgyzstan
Fossil taxa described in 2004
Taxa named by Thomas Martin (paleontologist)
Taxa named by Alexander O. Averianov
Prehistoric cynodont genera